Themis (minor planet designation: 24 Themis) is one of the largest asteroids in the asteroid belt. It is also the largest member of the Themistian family. It was discovered by Annibale de Gasparis on 5 April 1853. It is named after Themis, the personification of natural law and divine order in Greek mythology.

Not to be confused with 269 Justitia, named for Justitia, Themis' Roman name.

Discovery and observations 
24 Themis was discovered on 5 April 1853 by Annibale de Gasparis of Naples, though it was given its name by fellow Italian astronomer Angelo Secchi. The asteroid was named after Themis, the Greek goddess of law. Gravitational perturbations in the orbit of Themis were used to calculate the mass of Jupiter as early as 1875.

By analyzing the perturbation of Kugultinov's orbit due to the gravitational pull of Themis, the mass of Themis was determined to be approximately  solar masses ( Earth masses).

Orbit and rotation 
Themis is in an elliptical orbit around the Sun with an eccentricity of 0.1306 and an inclination of 0.76°. It has an orbital period of 5.54 years. The distance between Themis and the Sun ranges from 2.71 AU at perihelion and 3.55 AU at aphelion, with a mean distance of 3.1302 AU. Themis is part of the Themis family of asteroids, which is located in the outer part of the main belt. The family consists of a core of large objects surrounded by a cloud of smaller objects; 24 Themis is a member of the core.

Surface materials

Ice
On 7 October 2009, the presence of water ice was confirmed on the surface of this asteroid using NASA’s Infrared Telescope Facility. The surface of the asteroid appears completely covered in ice. As this ice layer is sublimated, it may be getting replenished by a reservoir of ice under the surface.

Scientists hypothesize that some of the first water brought to Earth was delivered by asteroid impacts after the collision that produced the Moon. The presence of ice on 24 Themis supports this theory. Because of its proximity to the sun (~3.2 AU), the widespread ice on the surface of 24 Themis is somewhat unexpected. The surface ice may be replenished by a sub-surface reservoir of water or impact gardening—a lunar phenomenon in which the moon overturns surface material at a rate of 1  m/ Gyr.

An alternative mechanism to explain the presence of water ice on 24 Themis is similar to the hypothesized formation of water on the surface of the Moon by solar wind. Trace amounts of water would be continuously produced by high-energy solar protons impinging oxide minerals present at the surface of the asteroid. The hydroxyl surface groups (S–OH) formed by the collision of protons with oxygen atoms present at oxide surface (S=O) can further be converted in water molecules adsorbed onto the oxide minerals surface. The chemical rearrangement supposed at the oxide surface could be schematically written as follows:

2 S-OH → S=O + S + 
or, 
2 S-OH → S–O–S + 

where S represents the oxide surface.

Organics
Organic compounds were also detected on the surface of Themis in the form of tholins, high-molecular weight organics found in the outer solar system, distinguished by a brown or reddish color in optical spectra. Compounds found in the spectra of Themis include ice tholin (the residual of an irradiated mixture of water ice and ethane), asphaltite, carbonaceous meteorite material, and polycyclic aromatic hydrocarbons.

See also 
Water presence on other celestial bodies:
 Extraterrestrial liquid water

References

External links 
 Asteroid Themis has 'frosted surface'
 NASA detection of Water Ice and organics on the surface of 24 Themis
 
 

000024
Discoveries by Annibale de Gasparis
Named minor planets
000024
000024
18530405
Extraterrestrial water